"I'll See You in My Dreams" is a 2020 song by Bruce Springsteen and the E Street Band. The song was released as a single in March 2021. The song was dedicated to Michael Gudinski with the music video released on March 3, the day after Gudinski died. The song is the closing track on the 2020 album Letter to You, and along with the opening track "One Minute You're Here", it is one of the two songs about mortality and death that bookend the album.

Performances
The song was first performed on November 18, 2020, at Colts Neck, along with another song from the same album, "House of a Thousand Guitars" and the 2007 song "Long Walk Home". Later, it was one of the two songs from the album, the other one being "Ghosts", performed on Saturday Night Live. On June 26, 2021, the song was added to the Springsteen on Broadway setlist, replacing "Born to Run" as the closing track.

On September 11, 2021, Springsteen performed "I'll See You in My Dreams" in tribute to the victims of the September 11 attacks.

Critical reception
Music Musings & Such gave the song 9.7/10 points, describing Springsteen's voice in the song as contemplative and spirited and saying there is clearly a lot of meaning and personal relevance behind the words; the song has a definite energy and verve that portrays a sense of reconciliation and optimism. Ultimate Classic Rock describes the album as ending as contemplatively as it begins, with the hopeful song declaring "death is not the end", and like the opening "One Minute You're Here," it serves as a melancholy bookend to Springsteen's most reflective work. NJ.com ranks the song 7th on the album, describing it as "a vibrant and telling finale to a record that could easily function as a fond farewell for the full-band outfit if they choose to never record another LP as ambitious as this one." Rolling Stone, comparing the song to opener "One Minute You're Here", says it is more of an upbeat and folky number that finds Springsteen echoing Dylan, declaring "death is not the end".

Personnel
Bruce Springsteen and the E Street Band
Roy Bittan– keyboards
Charles Giordano– organ
Nils Lofgren– guitar
Patti Scialfa– guitar, backing vocals
Bruce Springsteen– guitar, vocals, production
Garry Tallent– bass guitar
Steven Van Zandt– guitar
Max Weinberg– drums

Technical personnel
Ron Aniello– production
Bob Clearmountain– mixing
Bob Ludwig– mastering

Charts

"I'll See You in My Dreams" also peaked at #1 as its highest radio airplay chart position in the UK.

References

2021 singles
2020 songs
Bruce Springsteen songs
Song recordings produced by Bruce Springsteen
Song recordings produced by Ron Aniello
Songs written by Bruce Springsteen